Kickback.com was an esports platform that allowed users play competitive video games. Players of any skill level could enter ranked matches and compete for a chance to win tournaments using their skills in-game. Kickback integrated on top of popular existing games, where the service adds matchmaking, anti-cheat and support. These features were available to all users, but were made optional for users playing for fun. The site was backed by Y Combinator in 2015.

History
The website kickback.com launched on February 2, 2015, in San Francisco, California by hosting paid tournaments in Minecraft. Players competed against one another in player-versus-player matches for a chance to win prizes. On March 2, 2015, Kickback announced its Y Combinator backing and integration with PayPal. On December 1, 2015, Kickback began allowing users to play Counter-Strike: Global Offensive.

Games offered
Kickback offered a variety of Counter-Strike: Global Offensive minigames. Users are matched player versus player with the objective of defeating an opponent through in-game kills.  The site runs daily events that are free to enter and award real prizes.

References

External links
 

Online mass media companies of the United States
Esports websites
Internet properties established in 2014
Y Combinator companies